William Marcel "Buddy" Collette (August 6, 1921 – September 19, 2010) was an American jazz flutist, saxophonist, and clarinetist. He was a founding member of the Chico Hamilton Quintet.

Early life 

William Marcel Collette was born in Los Angeles on August 6, 1921.  He was raised in Watts, surrounded by people of all different ethnicities.  He lived in a house built by his father in an area with cheap, plentiful land.  The neighborhood in which he grew up was called Central Gardens area.  For elementary school, he attended Ninety-sixth Street School because it allowed black students.  Other schools in the area, such as South Gate Junior High School, did not and Collette often felt odd entering areas primarily inhabited by whites.  Collette's family did not have a lot of money, but his childhood gave him the chance to mix with all sorts of different people.  The “melting pot” of Watts framed the way he saw his position as a black man in the future.

Buddy Collette began playing piano at age ten, at his grandmother's request.  His love for music came not only from his community, but from his parents—his father played piano and his mother sang.  In middle school, he began playing the saxophone.  That same year, he formed his first band with Charlie Martin, Vernon Slater, Crosby Lewis, and Minor Robinson.  They played the music of Dootsie Williams, which Collette's parents had received while at a party.  The following year, Collette started a band with Ralph Bledsoe and Raleigh Bledsoe.  Together they played for less than a dollar each at parties put on by people in the area on Saturday nights.  Following this, Collette started a third group which eventually included Charles Mingus on bass.  Collette and Mingus became very good friends and Collette helped Mingus find his less wild, more reserved side.

During his childhood, Collette had plenty of  musicians to look up to.  William Jr., Coney, Britt, and George Woodman were the sons of trombonist, William Woodman.  Their ability to play gigs and make money while still in high school was inspiring to musicians like Collette, who were a few years younger.  When he was fifteen, Collette became a part of the Woodman brothers’ band, along with Joe Comfort, George Reed, and Jessie Sailes.  Collette credits the Woodman brothers with finding the jazz sound of Watts.

Music career
During his first couple years of high school, Collette began traveling to Los Angeles in order to form connections with other musicians.  At the Million Dollar Theatre, he and his band competed in a battle of the bands, but lost to a band that included Jackie Kelson, Chico Hamilton, and Al Adams.  Afterwards, Collette was asked to join the winning band, making twenty-one dollars per week. Later, Charles Mingus joined this band.

At the age of 19, Collette started taking musical lessons from Lloyd Reese, who also taught Eric Dolphy, Charles Mingus, and many others.  Collette credits Reese with teaching him and the other musicians how to manage themselves in the music world.

During World War II, Collette served with the U.S. Navy band attached to the pre-flight school at St. Mary's College. Led by Marshal Royal, it was one of two regimental bands of African-American musicians. From that band of 45 musicians, two dance bands were formed, the first being the Bombardiers, led by Royal. The second dance band, the Topflighters, was led by Collette, who had been playing with Les Hite’s band in 1941 before enlisting. His memoir records a trip that he, Bill Douglass, and Charles Mingus made from Los Angeles to San Francisco in October 1942, after hearing that a Navy officer was recruiting musicians from the union there to serve in an all-black band that would be stationed at St. Mary’s. Both Mingus and Douglass changed their minds, however. Douglass was later drafted by the Army; Mingus got re-classified 4-F. Collette, like most black Navy bandsmen, was trained at Camp Robert Smalls, at the Great Lakes, Chicago, complex of Navy bases.

According to Collette, he formed the second dance band at St. Mary's after he refused to join the Bombardiers on baritone sax, and along with most of the remaining fellows in the marching band realized that the dance band service was much easier than general musicians duty. Also in his band were Orlando Stallings on saxophone; James Ellison, Myers Franchot Alexander and Henry Godfrey on trumpet; George Lewis on first trombone; Ralph Thomas on bass tuba; and a few fellows he recalls only by nickname: “the Indian” on bass; “the Spider” and “the Crow” on tenor saxophones.

Both dance bands played gigs at the Stage Door Canteen, the USO in San Francisco that featured 24-hour service and entertainment, as featured acts and as back-ups to the stars that were performing there, usually unannounced, when they were in the San Francisco area.

Willie Humphrey, a New Orleans Dixieland jazz legend, joined the marching band late. Collette recalls that Marshal Royal didn’t realize who he was and wasn’t that interested in Dixieland, so Collette was able to get him into the Topflighters and subsequently arranged songs to highlight Humphrey’s talent.

Collette and others from St. Mary’s also played at clubs around San Francisco, especially in Oakland and at Redwood City, south of San Francisco, while in the Navy. “When you’re in uniform, you’re not supposed to be working outside,” he writes, “so we would get in civilian clothes–it was such a good job.” 

After serving as a U.S. Navy band leader, he played with the Stars of Swing (Woodman, Mingus, and Lucky Thompson), Louis Jordan, and Benny Carter.[3]

In 1949, he was the only black member of the band for You Bet Your Life, a TV and radio show hosted by Groucho Marx. In the 1950s, he worked as a studio musician with Frank Sinatra, Ella Fitzgerald, Duke Ellington, Count Basie, Nat King Cole, and Nelson Riddle.

In 1955 he was a founding member of the Chico Hamilton Quintet, playing chamber jazz flute with guitarist Jim Hall, cellist Fred Katz, and bassist Carson Smith.[1][4] He also taught, and his students included Mingus, James Newton, Eric Dolphy, Charles Lloyd, and Frank Morgan. He helped merge an all-black musicians' union with an all-white musicians' union.[1]

Although information on the relationship between Groucho Marx and Buddy Collette is scarce, there is no doubt that their relationship was significant. Marx, an American Jewish entertainer was, by the 1940s, one of the film industry's biggest superstars thanks to films such as “Duck Soup” and “A Night at the Opera.”  Marx's career successes, up to You Bet Your Life, had been shared with his brothers, who, as the Marx Brothers, had been entertaining the public since their childhood days in Vaudeville.

In 1949, Collette was the first black musician to be hired by a nationally broadcast TV studio orchestra, on You Bet Your Life, hosted by Groucho.  It has been noted that the conductor of the orchestra, Jerry Fielding, received hate-mail for standing by Collette.  Collette's job and job security on the popular television show signaled that opportunities were becoming more readily available for black musicians by the 1950s.

Musical collaborations 
Rising in success in the late 1940s, Buddy Collette was called upon frequently for collaborations and recordings on alto saxophone with musicians such as Ivie Anderson, Johnny Otis, Gerald Wilson, Ernie Andrews, and Charles Mingus. Most notably, Collette and Mingus formed their first band in 1933, the driving force that convinced Mingus to switch from cello to bass. The counterpoint between these this unlikely instrumental pairing blossomed into a lifelong friendship. He went on to form a short-lived yet cooperative band in 1946 with Mingus called Stars of the Swing, which also included trombonist Britt Woodman, trumpeter John Anderson, tenor saxophonist Lucky Thompson (replaced by Teddy Edwards early on), pianist Spaulding Givins (later known as Nadi Qamar), and drummer Oscar Bradley.

Furthermore, Collette collaborated with Benny Carter, the Community Symphony Orchestra in Los Angeles, Percy Faith, Joe Liggins, Gerald Wilson Orchestra, and was a musical director for the jazz band program at Loyola Marymount University.

Involvement in music unions 
Around the early 1900s, Los Angeles was primarily divided into two music unions: Local 47, a union for white musicians, and Local 767, a union for black musicians. Buddy Collette and several other black musicians including Bill Green, Charles Mingus, Britt Woodman Milt Holland made concentrated efforts to merge the two unions to one, color-blind union in the early 1950s. Initially, the merge existed as an interracial symphony performing at the Humanist Hall on Twenty-third and Union. This group received a great deal of publicity as iconic figures such as “Sweets” Edison, Nat King Cole, and Frank Sinatra provided public support of the interracial group. The success of this group led to the coalition of the two segregated locals.

Buddy Collette eventually made the board of Local 767 along with Bill Douglass in the vice-president's position. After three years of working with Leo Davis and James Petrillo, the presidents of Local 767 and Local 47 respectively, the two groups became what Collette calls an “amalgamation” of the two in 1953. This merging signified greater opportunity for these musicians in both careers and insurance benefits, as well as great racial advancement. Up to forty locals have since replicated this success elsewhere, which has allowed the talent of a musician as opposed to his/her race determine success.

Association with the Chico Hamilton Quintet 
In 1955, Buddy Collette became a founding member of the unusually instrumented chamber jazz quintet, led by percussionist Chico Hamilton. The quintet was notable for having cellist and pianist (Fred Katz) as the band's centerpiece, leading Collette to refer to Katz as “the first jazz cello player”. Also included in the quintet was guitarist Jim Hall and bassist Jim Aton, later replaced by Carson Smith. The group gained national prominence and became one of the most influential West Coast jazz bands, synonymous with the laidback “cool jazz” of the 1950s. In the quintet, Collette played the reeds (tenor and alto saxophones, the flute and clarinet).

In 1957, the group (accompanied by flutist Paul Horn and guitarist John Pisano) made a cameo appearance in the Burt Lancaster-Tony Curtis film, “Sweet Smell of Success”. Later that year, Collette collaborated with Horn in his own flutist ensemble, the "Swinging Shepherds", a four-flute-lineup. In November 1958, Langston Hughes read poems to accompaniment by Collette and his band at the Screen Directors Theatre in Los Angeles. In 1960, the quintet also gave a significant performance in the Newport Jazz Festival documentary "Jazz on a Summer’s Day”, alongside flutist Eric Dolphy. Later, in 1996, when the Library of Congress commissioned Collette to write and perform a special big-band concert to highlight his long career, he brought together some old musical collaborators to perform with him, including Chico Hamilton.

Death, legacy and influence 
He died in Los Angeles of heart failure at the age of 89.

Buddy Collette's career as a musician produced not only an ample discography, but created and transformed numerous musicians. Collette dedicated a large portion of his career to teaching and  mentoring others and helping younger artists that were once in his footsteps, into professional and highly skilled artists. Collette's mentees included Eric Dolphy, Frank Morgan, and James Newton.

Collette initially taught and mentored within the Watts district of Los Angeles, but later began traveling and performing around the country.Towards the later half of his career, Collette was in a high demand to teach seminars and music clinics in universities around the country, in addition to being asked to perform and take part in jam sessions. One of his most notable affiliations is with the UCLA oral history program, where he was a key contributor to the Central Avenue Sounds program ran by Stephen Isoardi. Collette also joined the faculty at California State University, Pomona campus in 1992 where he was a conductor of the jazz and combo band.  Collette also held important faculty positions at CSULA, CSULB, California State University Dominguez Hills, and Loyola Marymount University.
He was designated a Los Angeles Living Cultural Treasure by the city of Los Angeles in the late 1990s, and, in the early 2000s, he was composing music for JazzAmerica, a band of teen jazz virtuosos he co-founded.

Collette's legacy lives on through the various careers that he helped transform. Through his work with the conjunction of the music unions, as a host of regular jam sessions, and as an organizer for the multi-racial community Humanist Symphony Orchestra, Collette helped countless of musicians find their signature sounds and perfect their skills. Buddy Collette's career and accomplishments were rewarded by the Los Angeles Jazz Society where he received a special commendation, and with the Lifetime Achievement Award from the American Federation of Musicians. Local 47, for his musical contributions spanning four decades. Collette's legacy lives on through the JazzAmerica program, a non-profit organization which he co-founded in 1994 that aims at bringing jazz into classrooms in middle school and high schools in the greater Los Angeles area tuition-free.

Discography

As leader/co-leader
 Tanganyika (Dig, 1956)
 Man of Many Parts (Contemporary, 1956)
 Cool, Calm & Collette (ABC-Paramount, 1957)
 Everybody's Buddy (Challenge, 1957)
 Porgy & Bess (Interlude, 1957)
 Nice Day with Buddy Collette (Contemporary, 1957)
 Flute Fraternity (Mode, 1957) with Herbie Mann
 Aloha to Jazz (Bel Canto, 1957)
 Jazz Loves Paris (Specialty, 1958)
 Marx Makes Broadway, (VSOP, 1958)
 Buddy Collette's Swinging Shepherds (EmArcy, 1958)
 Buddy Collette Septet – Polynesia (Music & Sound, 1959)
 At the Cinema! (Mercury, 1959
 The Polyhedric Buddy Collette (Music Records, 1961)
 Buddy Collette in Italia (Ricordi, 1961
 The Soft Touch of Buddy Collette (Music Records, 1962)
 The Buddy Collette Quintet (Studio West, 1962) with Irene Kral
 The Girl from Ipenema (Crown, 1964)
 Warm Winds (World Pacific, 1964) with Charles Kynard
 Buddy Collette on Broadway (Survey, 1966)
 Now and Then (Legend, 1973)
 Block Buster (RGB, 1974)
 Flute Talk (Soul Note, 1988)
 Jazz for Thousand Oaks (UFO Bass, 1996)
 Live from the Nation's Capital (Bridge, 2000)
 Tasty Dish (Fresh Sound/Jazz Archives, 2004)
 Live at El Camino College (UFO Bass, 2006)

As sideman
With Chet Baker
 Blood, Chet and Tears (Verve, 1970)
With Louis Bellson
 Music, Romance and Especially Love (Verve, 1957)
 Louis Bellson Swings Jule Styne (Verve, 1960)
With Brass Fever
 Brass Fever (Impulse!, 1975)
 Time Is Running Out (Impulse!, 1976)
With James Brown
 Soul on Top (King, 1969)
With Red Callender
 Swingin' Suite (Crown, 1957)
The Lowest (MetroJazz, 1958) 
With Conte Candoli
Little Band Big Jazz (Crown, 1960)
With Benny Carter
Aspects (United Artists, 1959)
 Additions to Further Definitions (Impulse!, 1966)
With June Christy
 Something Cool (Capitol, 1955)
 Ballads for Night People (Capitol, 1959)
With Nat King Cole
 L-O-V-E (Capitol, 1965)
With Miles Davis and Michel Legrand
 Dingo (Warner Bros., 1991)
With Sammy Davis, Jr.
 The Wham of Sam (Reprise, 1961)
With Ella Fitzgerald
 Ella Fitzgerald Sings the George and Ira Gershwin Songbook (Verve, 1959)
With Gil Fuller
 Gil Fuller & the Monterey Jazz Festival Orchestra featuring Dizzy Gillespie (Pacific Jazz, 1965)
With Ted Gärdestad
 Blue Virgin Isles (Epic, 1978)
With Jimmy Giuffre
 The Jimmy Giuffre Clarinet (Atlantic, 1956)

With Chico Hamilton
 Chico Hamilton Quintet featuring Buddy Collette (Pacific Jazz, 1955)
 The Original Chico Hamilton Quintet (World Pacific, 1955 [1960])
 Chico Hamilton Quintet in Hi Fi (Pacific Jazz, 1956)
 Ellington Suite (World Pacific, 1959)
 The Three Faces of Chico (Warner Bros., 1959)

With Eddie Harris
 How Can You Live Like That? (Atlantic, 1976)
With Jon Hendricks
 ¡Salud! João Gilberto, Originator of the Bossa Nova (Reprise, 1961)
With Freddie Hubbard
 The Love Connection (Columbia, 1979)
With Quincy Jones
 Go West, Man! (ABC Paramount, 1957)
With Fred Katz
 Soul° Cello (Decca, 1958)
 Folk Songs for Far Out Folk (Warner Bros., 1958)
With Stan Kenton
 Kenton / Wagner (Capitol, 1964)
With Barney Kessel
 Easy Like (Contemporary, 1956)
 Music to Listen to Barney Kessel By (Contemporary, 1957)
 Carmen (Contemporary, 1958)
With Wade Marcus
 Metamorphosis (Impulse!, 1976)
With Les McCann
 Les McCann Sings (Pacific Jazz, 1961)
With Carmen McRae
 Carmen for Cool Ones (Decca, 1958)
 Portrait of Carmen (Atlantic, 1968)
With Charles Mingus
 The Complete Town Hall Concert (Blue Note, 1962 [1994])
With Blue Mitchell
 Bantu Village (Blue Note, 1969)
With Lyle Murphy
 Four Saxophones in Twelve Tones (GNP, 1955)
With Oliver Nelson
 Zig Zag (Original Motion Picture Score) (MGM, 1970)
 Skull Session (Flying Dutchman, 1975)
 Stolen Moments (East Wind, 1975)
With Dory Previn
 On My Way to Where (United Artists, 1970)
 Mythical Kings and Iguanas (United Artists, 1971)
 Dory Previn (Warner Bros., 1974)
With Don Ralke
 Bongo Madness (Crown, 1957)
With Buddy Rich
 This One's for Basie (Norgran, 1956)
With Little Richard
 Mr. Big (Joy, 1965 [1971])
With Shorty Rogers
 The Fourth Dimension in Sound (Warner Bros., 1961)
With Pete Rugolo
The Music from Richard Diamond (EmArcy, 1959)
Behind Brigitte Bardot (Warner Bros., 1960)
With Horace Silver
 Silver 'n Wood (Blue Note, 1974)
 Silver 'n Brass (Blue Note, 1975)
 The Continuity of Spirit (Silverto, 1985)
With Frank Sinatra
 Sinatra's Swingin' Session!!! (Capitol, 1961)
 L.A. Is My Lady (Qwest, 1984)
With Gábor Szabó and Bob Thiele
 Light My Fire (Impulse!, 1967)
With The Three Sounds
 Soul Symphony (Blue Note, 1969)
 Persistent Percussion (1960, Kent, KST 500)
With Mel Tormé
 Comin' Home Baby! (Atlantic, 1962)
With Stanley Turrentine
 Everybody Come On Out (Fantasy, 1976)
With Gerald Wilson
 You Better Believe It! (Pacific Jazz, 1961)
 Lomelin (Discovery, 1981)
With Nancy Wilson
 Broadway – My Way (Capitol, 1964)
With Red Norvo
 Ad Lib (Liberty, 1957)

References

Further reading
 Jazz Generations: A Life in American Music and Society by Buddy Collette with Steven Iosardi (2000)

External links
 Interview at UCLA Oral History Project 
Buddy Collette - NAMM Oral History Library (2008)



1921 births
2010 deaths
20th-century American male musicians
20th-century clarinetists
20th-century American saxophonists
Activists for African-American civil rights
Activists from California
African-American jazz musicians
American jazz saxophonists
American male saxophonists
American jazz flautists
American jazz clarinetists
Brass Fever members
Burials at Forest Lawn Memorial Park (Glendale)
Cool jazz clarinetists
Cool jazz flautists
Cool jazz saxophonists
Jazz musicians from California
American male jazz musicians
Musicians from Los Angeles
West Coast jazz clarinetists
West Coast jazz flautists
West Coast jazz saxophonists
20th-century African-American musicians
21st-century African-American people
20th-century flautists